Brachyelytrum erectum, known as the southern shorthusk or the southern long-awned woodgrass, is a perennial grass native to North America. Its specific epithet "erectum" refers to the erect culms of the grass. Its diploid number is 22.

Description

Abaxial sides of leaf blades are pilose on their veins, adaxial sides are glabrous, and leaf margins are scabrous. The first glume tends to be obsolete or vestigial, and the second glume is aristate. The rachilla is present as a slender, naked bristle behind the palea, about half to two-thirds as long. The grass flowers from June into August.

Distribution and habitat
Brachyelytrum erectum can be found in woods, thickets, and occasionally occurring on beds of limestone or other alkaline bedrock. Its grows in Canada from Lake of the Woods east to Newfoundland and in the United States from western Massachusetts to Iowa and south to Alabama, Mississippi, and Louisiana.

References

Pooideae
Flora of North America
Plants described in 1812